Kahna Nau is a town of Lahore District on Firozpur road 15 km away from Lahore in Punjab. The population as of the 2017 census is 79,301.

See also 
 Kanhaiya Misl, Sikh confederacy, founded by a native of Kahna

References 

Populated places in Lahore District